Vysokoye is a rural locality (a selo) in Rogozovsky Selsoviet of Romnensky District, Amur Oblast, Russia. The population was 16 as of 2018. There are 2 streets.

Geography 
Vysokoye is located on the left bank of the Amaranka River, 59 km southwest of Romny (the district's administrative centre) by road. Grigoryevka is the nearest rural locality.

References 

Rural localities in Romnensky District